The discography of Don Omar, a Puerto Rican Reggaeton singer, consists of seven studio albums, four live albums, three re-release albums, five compilation albums, thirty-six singles (including singles from studio, live, compilation albums and collaborations), four video albums and twenty-seven music videos.

On 2003, Don Omar released his debut album The Last Don including the singles "Dale Don Dale", "Dile" and "Intocable". In the U.S., the album reached number one on the Billboard Top Latin Albums chart, but on the main Billboard 200, it only reached #165. His second album King of Kings was released in 2006. King of Kings is his album of most highest rank to date, reaching number one on the Billboard Top Latin Albums chart and number seven on the Billboard 200. The album had three singles: "Angelito", "Conteo" and "Salió el Sol".

Don Omar released his third studio album, iDon, in 2009, featuring the singles "Virtual Diva", "Sexy Robótica" and "Ciao Bella". On November 2010, Don Omar released the collaborative album titled Meet the Orphans, featuring the promo single "Hasta Abajo", the Worldwide hit "Danza Kuduro" and "Taboo".

Albums

Studio albums

Compilation albums

Live albums

Video albums

Singles

As lead artist

As featured artist

Promotional singles

Other charted songs

Collaborations

Music videos

As lead artist

As featured artist

References

Discographies of Puerto Rican artists
Reggaeton discographies
Discography